Faye Armitage (born 29 May 1958 in Bogotá, Colombia) is a health activist and Florida politician, known for her advocacy efforts in support of stem cell research.

Personal life

Armitage was raised in four different continents as a result of her father's employment with a multi-national corporation. She graduated from the University of Amsterdam with an MA in Economics before settling in the United States. She is a naturalized American citizen. Armitage has served as a professor of economics at Valencia Community College in Orlando.

Health activism

Armitage became a campaigner for embryonic stem cell research, patient safety and universal health care after a 1996 soccer accident which left her 7-year-old son a quadriplegic. She founded the Cure Paralysis Now Foundation in partnership with the Stem Cell Action Network and other stem cell advocacy groups.  Ultimately she gave up her outside employment to devote herself to caring for her son and to her advocacy efforts.

Political activities

Armitage was the winner of the Democratic primary for Florida's 7th congressional district on August 26, 2008 and became the Democratic candidate in the 2008 Congressional race, running as a self-described "soccer mom".  Her political positions included ending the war in Iraq, increasing veterans benefits, immigration reform, reconciling U.S. debt while reducing trade deficits and attending to world climate change.  She was defeated by John Mica, the longtime Republican incumbent.  Since the election she has continued her advocacy for stem cell research.

References

External links
 Cure Paralysis Now
 Stem Cell Action Network

Florida Democrats
Living people
American activists
1958 births